The Battle of Cape Palos may refer to:

 Battle of the Gulf of Almería (1591), also called Battle of Cape Palos, naval engagement of the Anglo-Spanish War (1585–1604).
 Battle of Cape Palos (1617), naval engagement of the Spanish-Barbary Wars.
 Battle of Cape Palos (1758), naval engagement of the Spanish-Barbary Wars.
 Battle of Cape Palos (1815), naval engagement of the Second Barbary War.
 Battle of Cape Palos (1938), naval engagement of the Spanish Civil War.